The National College of Business Administration and Economics (NCBAE) is a private university located in Lahore, Punjab, Pakistan.

Schools 
Currently, NCBA&E has two schools: and has one faculty of Social Sciences. These schools and faculty of social sciences cover a vast range of disciplines and offers market valued programs of undergraduate studies,graduate studies and post-graduate studies.
 The School of Business Administration 
 The School of Computer Sciences
 Faculty of Social Sciences

Academic courses 
This university was founded in 1994. The disciplines offered are Business Studies, Computer Science, Software Engineering, Telecommunication, Human Resource Management, Multimedia Arts, Fine Arts, Environmental Management, Mathematics and Social Sciences. It offers undergraduate and post graduate degrees. Its main campus is located in Lahore and sub-campuses are located in Multan, Bahawalpur and Rahim Yar Khan.

Government-recognized and listed institution
National College of Business Administration and Economics is ranked number 5 and listed on the Higher Education Commission (Pakistan) website 
in their 'Business Education' section.

Campuses
 Main campus at Lahore, Pakistan
 Sub-campus at Multan
 Sub-campus at Bahawalpur
 Sub-campus at Gujrat
 Sub-campus at Rahim Yar Khan

References

External links
National College of Business Administration and Economics - official website

Private universities and colleges in Punjab, Pakistan
Universities and colleges in Lahore
National College of Business Administration and Economics alumni